The 2016–17 West of Scotland Super League was the fifteenth Super League competition since the formation of the Scottish Junior Football Association, West Region in 2002. The league comprised two divisions, a West of Scotland Super League Premier Division of twelve clubs and a West of Scotland Super League First Division of fourteen clubs. There were two automatic relegation places between the divisions, while the third-bottom placed side in the Premier Division entered the West Region league play-off, a two-legged tie against the third placed side in the First Division, to decide the final promotion/relegation spot. The winners of the Super League Premier Division are eligible to enter round one of the 2017–18 Scottish Cup.

Super League Premier Division

Member clubs for the 2016–17 season
Auchinleck Talbot were the reigning champions.

Cumnock Juniors and Largs Thistle were promoted from the Super League First Division, replacing the automatically relegated Petershill and Irvine Meadow.

Kiilwinning Rangers claimed a third promotion spot after defeating Shettleston 5–3 on aggregate in the West Region League play-off.

1 Groundsharing with Cumbernauld United F.C.

Managerial changes

League table

Results

West Region League play-off
Kilwinning Rangers retained their place in the West of Scotland Super League Premier Division after defeating Kilsyth Rangers 3–2 on aggregate in the West Region League play-off.

Super League First Division

Member clubs for the 2016–17 season
The First Division had a 50% turnover of membership for the 2016–17 season with seven new clubs. Irvine Meadow and Petershill were automatically relegated from the Super League Premier Division and were joined by Shettleston who lost the West Region League play-off to Kilwinning Rangers.

Girvan and Irvine Victoria were promoted from the Ayrshire District League while Maryhill and Renfrew joined after gaining promotion from the Central District First Division.

Managerial changes

League table

Results

References

6
SJFA West Region Premiership seasons